Ship Pond is an  reservoir in the Vallerville village of Plymouth, Massachusetts located in a narrow area between Route 3A and Cape Cod Bay, south of Surfside Beach, north of Bayside Beach, and east of Morey Hole. The pond is a secondary municipal water supply for the Town of Plymouth.

External links
South Shore Coastal Watersheds - Lake Assessments

Ponds of Plymouth, Massachusetts
Ponds of Massachusetts